Panthera is a genus within the family Felidae that was named and described by Lorenz Oken in 1816 who placed all the spotted cats in this group. Reginald Innes Pocock revised the classification of this genus in 1916 as comprising the tiger (P. tigris), lion (P. leo), jaguar (P. onca), and leopard (P. pardus) on the basis of common cranial features. Results of genetic analysis indicate that the snow leopard (formerly Uncia uncia) also belongs to the genus Panthera (P. uncia), a classification that was accepted by IUCN Red List assessors in 2008.

Etymology
The word panther derives from classical Latin panthēra, itself from the ancient Greek pánthēr (πάνθηρ).

Characteristics
In Panthera species, the dorsal profile of the skull is flattish or evenly convex. The frontal interorbital area is not noticeably elevated, and the area behind the elevation is less steeply sloped. The basicranial axis is nearly horizontal. The inner chamber of the bullae is large, the outer small. The partition between them is close to the external auditory meatus. The convexly rounded chin is sloping.
All Panthera species have an incompletely ossified hyoid bone. A specially adapted larynx with proportionally larger vocal folds is covered in a large fibro-elastic pad. These characteristics enable them to roar. Only the snow leopard cannot roar, as it has shorter vocal folds of  that provide a lower resistance to airflow; it was therefore proposed to be retained in the genus Uncia.
Panthera species can prusten, which is a short, soft, snorting sound; it is used during contact between friendly individuals. The roar is an especially loud call with a distinctive pattern that depends on the species.

Evolution
The geographic origin of the Panthera is most likely northern Central Asia. Panthera blytheae, the oldest known Panthera species, is similar in skull features to the snow leopard. The tiger, snow leopard, and clouded leopard genetic lineages dispersed in Southeast Asia during the Miocene.
Genetic studies indicate that the pantherine cats diverged from the subfamily Felinae between six and ten million years ago.
The genus Neofelis is sister to Panthera.
The snow leopard is nested within Panthera and is the sister species of the tiger.

Results of a 2016 study based on analysis of biparental nuclear genomes suggest the following relationships of living Panthera species:

The extinct European jaguar (Panthera gombaszogensis), was probably closely related to the modern jaguar.

Classification
During the 19th and 20th centuries, various explorers and staff of natural history museums suggested numerous subspecies, or at times called "races", for all Panthera species. The taxonomist Reginald Innes Pocock reviewed skins and skulls in the zoological collection of the Natural History Museum, London, and grouped subspecies described, thus shortening the lists considerably.
Since the mid-1980s, several Panthera species became subjects of genetic research, mostly using blood samples of captive individuals. Study results indicate that many of the lion and leopard subspecies are questionable because of insufficient genetic distinction between them.
Subsequently, it was proposed to group all African leopard populations to P. p. pardus and retain eight subspecific names for Asian leopard populations.

Based on genetic research, it was suggested to group all living sub-Saharan lion populations into P. l. leo.
Results of phylogeographic studies indicate that the Western and Central African lion populations are more closely related to those in India and form a different clade than lion populations in Southern and East Africa; southeastern Ethiopia is an admixture region between North African and East African lion populations.

Black panthers do not form a distinct species, but are melanistic specimens of the genus, most often encountered in the leopard and jaguar.

Contemporary species
The following list of the genus Panthera is based on the taxonomic assessment in Mammal Species of the World and reflects the taxonomy revised in 2017 by the Cat Classification Task Force of the Cat Specialist Group:

Extinct species and subspecies

Other, now invalid, species have also been described, such as Panthera crassidens from South Africa, which was later found to be based on a mixture of leopard and cheetah fossils.

Phylogeny

The cladogram below follows Mazák, Christiansen and Kitchener (2011).

In 2018, results of a phylogenetic study on living and fossil cats were published. This study was based on the morphological diversity of the mandibles of saber-toothed cats, their speciation and extinction rates. The generated cladogram indicates a different relation of the Panthera species, as shown below:

See also

 Panthera hybrid
 Panther (legendary creature)

References

Further reading

External links
 
 
 

 
Mammal genera
Extant Miocene first appearances
Taxa named by Lorenz Oken
Taxa described in 1816